The Mobira Cityman 900 was released in 1987 by Nokia-Mobira. It was one of the first handheld cell phones. The nickname of the phone in Finland was Gorba. This was because the General Secretary of the Communist Party of the Soviet Union Mikhail Gorbachev used a Cityman 900 (presented to him) to call Moscow during a press conference in October 1989 from the Hotel Kalastajantorppa.

Design
The Cityman 900 has a total weight of 760 g. The phone measures 183 × 43 × 79 mm.

In popular culture
The Cityman 900 is featured prominently in several scenes from the 1987 film Lethal Weapon.

References

External links
Nokiamuseum.com, Cityman 900
Salo Museum of Industrial and Cultural Heritage SAMU, Mobira Cityman 900 
Mediamuseo Rupriikki, Mobira Cityman (in Finnish)

Nokia mobile phones
Mobile phones introduced in 1987